Tourism – travel for pleasure or business; also the theory and practice of touring, the business of attracting, accommodating, and entertaining tourists, and the business of operating tours. Tourism may be international, or within the traveller's country. The World Tourism Organization defines tourism more generally, in terms which go "beyond the common perception of tourism as being limited to holiday activity only", as people "traveling to and staying in places outside their usual environment for not more than one consecutive year for leisure, business and other purposes".

What type of thing is tourism? 

Tourism can be described as all of the following:
 A form of recreation
 An economic sector

Types of tourism 
 Accessible tourism
 Adventure travel
 Agritourism
 Alternative tourism
 Atomic tourism
 Birth tourism
 Business tourism
 Culinary tourism
 Enotourism
 Cultural tourism
 Archaeological tourism
 Bookstore tourism
 Music tourism
 Pop-culture tourism
 Dark tourism
 Holocaust tourism
 Disaster tourism
 Domestic tourism
 Drug tourism
 Ecotourism
 Shark tourism
 Extreme tourism
 Factory tour
 Garden tourism
 Genealogy tourism
 Geotourism
 Heritage tourism
 Militarism heritage tourism
 Honeymoon
 Jihadi tourism
 Jungle tourism
 Justice tourism
 LGBT tourism
 Literary tourism
 Tolkien tourism
 Medical tourism
 Dental tourism
 Tourism on the Moon
 Nautical tourism
 Lists of named passenger trains
 Religious tourism
 Christian tourism
 Halal tourism
 Kosher tourism
 Rural tourism
 Sacred travel
 Safaris
 Sex tourism
 Child sex tourism
 Female sex tourism
 Slum tourism
 Space tourism
 Sports tourism
 Stag party tourism
 Suicide tourism
 Sustainable tourism
 Vacation
 Volunteer travel
 War tourism
 Water tourism
 Wellness tourism
 Wildlife tourism

History of tourism 

History of tourism
 Grand Tour

Tourism support services

Hospitality industry 

Hospitality industry
 Bed and breakfast
 Boutique hotel
 Conference and resort hotels
 Convention center
 Destination spa
 Receptionist
 General manager
 Homestay
 Hospitality management studies
 Hostel
 Hotel
 Hotel manager
 Inn
 Resort island
 Motel
 Referral chain
 Resort
 Resort town
 Restaurant
 Seaside resort
 Ski resort

General tourism concepts 

 Campus tour
 Convention (meeting)
 Gift shop
 Grand Tour
 Holiday (vacation)
 Hypermobility
 Package tour
 Passport
 Perpetual traveler
 Road trip
 Roadside attraction
 Souvenir
 Staycation
 Sunday drive
 Tour guide
 Tour operator
 Tourism geography
 Tourism minister
 Tourism region
 Tourist attraction
 Tourist gateway
 Tourist trap
 Touron
 Transport
 Travel
 Travel agency
 Travel behavior
 Travel document
 Travel insurance
 Travel medicine
 Travel survey
 Travel technology
 Travel warning
 Travel website
 Trip planner
 Visa
 Visitor center

Tourism organizations 
 Trade associations
 American Bus Association
 American Hotel and Lodging Association
 American Hotel & Lodging Educational Institute
 BEST Education Network
 Caribbean Tourism Organization
 Destination marketing organization
 European Travel Commission
 South-East Asian Tourism Organisation
 World Tourism Organization
 World Travel and Tourism Council

Tourism media 
 Historical Archive on Tourism
 Tourism Radio
 Travel Channel
 World Travel Monitor

Tourism publications 
 Travel and Tourism Competitiveness Report
 Wikivoyage
 Travel literature

Persons influential in tourism 
Gérard Blitz (entrepreneur)
George Bradshaw
Thomas Cook
Paul Dubrule and Gérard Pelisson
Arthur Frommer
Stelios Haji-Ioannou
Conrad Hilton
Michael O'Leary (businessman)
Henry Lunn
Roy Thomson, 1st Baron Thomson of Fleet
Juan Trippe
Maureen Wheeler and Tony Wheeler

See also 

 World Tourism Day
 World Tourism rankings

 Lists 
 Adjectival tourisms
 Attractions
 Bibliography
 Casino hotels
 Casinos
 Convention and exhibition centers
 Hotels
 Largest hotels in the world
 Motels
 Travel magazines
 UNESCO Intangible Cultural Heritage Lists
 World Heritage Sites by country

References

External links 

 Wikivoyage — The free, worldwide travel guide that anyone can edit.
 

Tourism
Tourism